Agostocaris is a genus of crustaceans belonging to the monotypic family Agostocarididae.

The species of this genus are found in the Caribbean.

Species:

Agostocaris acklinsensis 
Agostocaris bozanici 
Agostocaris williamsi 
Agostocaris zabaletai

References

Crustaceans